Last Night in the Bittersweet is the fourth studio album by Scottish singer-songwriter Paolo Nutini, released on 1 July 2022 by Atlantic Records. Two songs from the album, "Through the Echoes" and "Lose It", were jointly released on 11 May 2022. Last Night in the Bittersweet is Nutini's first release in eight years, following his third studio album, Caustic Love (2014).

Critical reception
Last Night in Bittersweet received a score of 87 out of 100 on review aggregator Metacritic from four critics' reviews, indicating "universal acclaim".

Commercial performance
The album debuted at number one on the UK Albums Chart dated 8 July 2022, and by midweek, was outselling the album at number two by a ratio of 4:1. It is Nutini's third consecutive UK number-one album.

Track listing

Personnel
Musicians

 Paolo Nutini – vocals (all tracks), bass guitar (3, 4, 6, 7, 12), acoustic guitar (3, 9, 11–13, 15), piano (3), synthesizer (4, 6, 8, 12, 15), organ (9), electric guitar (10)
 Gavin Fitzjohn – electric guitar (1, 3, 4, 6–15), bass guitar (1); flugelhorn, saxophone (2); organ (3, 7, 8), acoustic guitar (4, 10, 15), programming (6), percussion (8, 10), piano (11, 15), synthesizer (12, 13)
 John Blease – drums (1, 3, 4, 7, 8, 10–12, 14, 15), percussion (8, 10)
 Jordi Fuster – electric guitar (1, 4, 7, 8, 10–12), acoustic guitar (12)
 Dani Castelar – programming (1, 3–15), skit (2), electric guitar (4), synthesizer (6)
 Donato di Trapani – synthesizer (1, 11, 12, 14), Hammond organ (10), piano (14)
 Dave Nelson – acoustic guitar, electric guitar (2)
 Matty Benbrook – drums, synthesizer (2)
 Pat Noodle – Mellotron (3)
 Tom Herbert – bass guitar (4, 5, 7–9, 11, 12, 15)
 Damon Reece – drums (6)
 Gerard Ballester – drums (8)
 Tom Pinder – trombone (8)
 Michael Mcdaid – acoustic guitar (9); backing vocals, bass guitar (10); electric guitar (14)
 Joe Glossop – Hammond organ (10), organ (15)
 Daniel Forouhar – twelve-string guitar, bass guitar, electric guitar (13)
 Scott Anderson – drums (13)
 Peter Riley – electric guitar (13)
 The Frying Salsiccia Brothers – backing vocals (14)
 Rob Moose – strings (14)

Technical
 Paolo Nutini – production
 Dani Castelar – production (all tracks), mixing (3, 5, 11, 12), engineering (1–15)
 Gavin Fitzjohn – production (all tracks), engineering (3, 4, 8)
 Matt Colton – mastering
 Paul Savage – mixing (1, 2, 6–10, 13)
 Richard Woodcraft – mixing (4, 14–16), engineering (3–5, 7, 9, 12, 15, 16), additional production (12, 15, 16)
 Joe Jones – engineering (1, 10), engineering assistance (7)
 Rhys Evans – engineering (4)
 Kevin Burleigh – engineering (13)

Artwork
 Alex Cowper – design
 David Sanden – design
 Reuben Sutherland – design
 Shamil Tanna – photography
 Paolo Nutini – cover art concept, back cover photo

Charts

Weekly charts

Year-end charts

Certifications

References

2022 albums
Atlantic Records albums
Paolo Nutini albums